The Islamic sciences are a set of traditionally defined religious sciences practiced by Islamic scholars, aimed at the construction and interpretation of Islamic religious knowledge.

Different sciences
These sciences include:
: Islamic jurisprudence
: the study of the authenticity of Prophetic traditions or hadith
: the biographical study of hadith transmitters with the purpose of evaluating their trustworthiness
 (sometimes also called , "the roots of religion"): speculative theology
: Arabic grammar
: interpretation of the Qur'an
: the study of abrogation (parts of the Qur'an which supersede or cancel other parts)
: rules for the proper recitation of the Qur'an
: on the various ways in which the Qur'an can be recited
: Islamic eschatology (on the end times and the Day of Resurrection)
 : moral philosophy was an important subject for Muslim intellectuals in medieval Islam.

In Shiʿi Islam
Shiʿi Islam
Many of the same subjects are studied at Shiʿi seminaries (known as hawza), but there are some differences:

 (Islamic philosophy)
Fiqh (jurisprudence)
'Ilm al-Hadith (traditions)Ilm al-Kalam (theology)
'''Ilm ar-Rijal (evaluation of biographies)
 (Islamic mysticism)
 (Logic)
Lugha (language studies)
Tafsir al-Qur'an (interpretation of the Qur'an)
Tarikh (history)
Ulum al-Qur'an (Qur'an sciences)
Usul al-Fiqh (principles of jurisprudence)

According to Abu Hamid Al‑Ghazali
The celebrated Islamic scholar Abu Hamid Al‑Ghazali wrote on Islamic sciences in his well known book The Revival of Religious Sciences (Ihya `ulum al‑din). He argued that a Muslim has a religious obligation (wajib) to know whatever aspects of religious science are necessary for them to obey Shari'ah in doing whatever work it is they do.  So, for example, someone working in animal husbandry should know rules concerning zakat; a merchant "doing business in an usurious environment", should learn rules about riba so as "to effectively avoid it". Sciences whose knowledge is wajib kifa'i (must be known by some people in society, although once enough people have met the obligation, the rest of the population is relieved of it).

Al‑Ghazali considers wajib kifa'i religious sciences to be classified into four groups:
 Usul (principles; i.e. the Qur’an, the sunnah, ijma` or consensus and the traditions of the Prophet's companions)
 Furu` (secondary matters; i.e. problems of jurisprudence, ethics and mystical experience)
 Introductory studies (Arabic grammar, syntax, etc.)
 Complementary studies (recitation and interpretation of the Qur’an, study of the principles of jurisprudence, `ilm al‑rijal or biographical research about narrators of Islamic traditions etc.)

Al‑Ghazzali aserts that not all religious sciences are "praiseworthy" (mahmud), as some  proport to be "oriented towards the Shari'ah but actually deviate from its teachings". These are known as "undesirable" (madhmum).

See also

List of contemporary Islamic scholars
Ulama
Islamic advice literature

References

Works cited
 

Islamic belief and doctrine
Islamic education